The Atlantic needlefish (Strongylura marina) is a common demersal needlefish species common in marinas and other areas with minimal currents. Its extremely long jaw and body set this fish apart from other predators. Atlantic needlefish are found from Maine to Brazil and have been known to venture into fresh water for short periods.

Geographic range
S. marina is found along western Atlantic coastal waters from Maine to southern Brazil, including areas along the coast of the Gulf of Mexico and Caribbean. Atlantic needlefish are not restricted to ocean waters; they can be found in various estuaries and are capable of ascending well upstream into fresh water. S. marina is found in shallow waters throughout the Chesapeake Bay. In Texas, S. marina is known to inhabit these drainage units: Sabine Lake (including minor coastal drainages west to Galveston Bay), Galveston Bay (including minor coastal drainages west to mouth of Brazos River), Brazos River, Colorado River, San Antonio Bay (including minor coastal drainages west of mouth of Colorado River to the mouth of Nueces River), and Nueces River. S. marina has also been introduced and now inhabits parts of the Tennessee River drainage throughout Alabama and Tennessee.

Ecology
As juveniles, the diet of S. marina consists of 70% shrimp, mysids, and amphipods and 30% fish, while adults are exclusively piscivorous.

The predators of S. marina include larger piscivorous fish such as the Atlantic tarpon (Megalops atlanticus). Less common predators include  the common bottlenose dolphin (Tursiops truncatus) and juvenile lemon sharks (Negaprion brevirostris). Since they are surface swimmers, Atlantic needlefish are also preyed upon by some birds. The competitors of S. marina include similar-sized piscivorous fish species such as bonefish. Although the maximum salinity S. marina can tolerate is 36.9 ppt, they are able to adapt to a wide range of salinities, regularly venturing into fresh water.

Life history
Spawning typically occurs in late spring and summer. In Texas, near ripe females have been reported in February. Females lay eggs that have many long, filamentous tendrils which attach to floating vegetation or other submerged objects and organisms. S. marina reaches reproductive maturity two years after being hatched. Spawning activity occurs in shallow, inshore habitats with submerged algal masses.

S. marina depends on submerged vegetation for breeding and shelter. In the Gulf of Mexico, the eggs of S. marina attach to sargassum seaweed.

Conservation
S. marina is not currently considered to be a threatened species. It is not of high commercial importance, but a fishery exists for it and it is sometimes taken as bycatch. Sport fishermen take it by angling and seining, and then use it as bait.

References

External links
Strongylura marina Smithsonian Marine station at Fort Pierce
 

marina
Fish described in 1792
Fish of the Atlantic Ocean